Jean Guttery Fritz (November 16, 1915 – May 14, 2017) was an American children's writer best known for American biography and history. She won the Children's Legacy Literature Award for her career contribution to American children's literature in 1986. She turned 100 in November 2015 and died in May 2017 at the age of 101.

Early life
Fritz was born to American Presbyterian missionaries Arthur Minton Guttery and the former Myrtle Chaney in Hankow, China, where she lived until she was twelve. Growing up, she attended a British school and kept a journal about her days in China with her amah, Lin Nai-Nai. The family emigrated to the United States when she was in eighth grade.

She graduated from Wheaton College in Massachusetts in 1937 and married Michael Fritz in 1941. They had two children, David and Andrea.

Career
Fritz's writing career started with the publication of several short stories in Humpty Dumpty magazine early in the 1950s. Her first book, Bunny Hopwell's First Spring, was published in 1954 and followed in 1955 by 121 Pudding Street, a work based on her own children. She often wrote westerns and other stories of frontier America because Arthur told her stories of American heroes as she was growing up. Her first historical novel for children was The Cabin Faced West (1958). Her autobiography, Homesick, My Own Story (1982), won a National Book Award for Young People's Literature in the Children's Fiction category and was a runner-up for the Newbery Medal.

The latter American Library Association award recognizes the year's best American children's book but almost always goes to fiction. Later, Fritz won two annual Boston Globe–Horn Book Awards for children's nonfiction. In 1986, she received the Laura Ingalls Wilder Award from the ALA, which recognizes a living author or illustrator, whose books, published in the United States, have made "a substantial and lasting contribution to literature for children". At the time it was awarded every three years. That year she was also U.S. nominee for the biennial, international Hans Christian Andersen Award, the highest international recognition available to creators of children's books.

Selected awards 
New York Times outstanding book of the year citations:
 1973 – And Then What Happened, Paul Revere?
 1974 – Why Don't You Get a Horse, Sam Adams?
 1975 – Where Was Patrick Henry on the 29th of May?
 1976 – What's the Big Idea, Ben Franklin?
 1981 – Traitor: The Case of Benedict Arnold
 1982 – Homesick, My Own Story 
 1983 – Newbery Honor Award, National Book Award, and Boston Globe-Horn Book Honor book, all for Homesick: My Own Story.
 1989 – Laura Ingalls Wilder Award, Orbis Pictus Award, National Council of English Teachers, for 1986 The Great Little Madison (1986)

Works

Autobiography
 Homesick: My Own Story, illustrated with drawings by Margot Tomes and photographs (New York: G.P. Putnam's Sons, 1982);  
 China Homecoming, photographs by Michael Fritz (New York: G.P. Putnam's Sons, 1985); 
 Surprising Myself, photographs by Andrea Fritz Pfleger (Katonah, New York: R.C. Owen Publishers, 1992);

Other
 
 Bunny Hopwell's First Spring (1954) 
 Fish Head (1954), illus. Marc Simont
 121 Pudding Street (1955) 
 The Cabin Faced West (1958)
 Champion Dog Prince Tom (1958)
 Brady (1960)
 Magic to Burn (1964)
 Early Thunder (1967)
 George Washington's Breakfast (1969)
 Cast for a Revolution: Some American Friends and Enemies 1728-1814 (1972)
 And Then What Happened, Paul Revere?, illus. Margot Tomes (Coward, 1973)
 Why Don't You Get a Horse, Sam Adams? (1974)
 Will You Sign Here, John Hancock?, illus. Trina Schart Hyman (Coward, 1975)
 Where Was Patrick Henry on the 29th of May? (1975)
 Who's That Stepping on Plymouth Rock? (1975)
 Can't You Make Them Behave, King George? (1976)
 Shh! We're Writing the Constitution (1976)
 Stonewall, illus. Stephen Gammell (Putnam, 1979)
 Brendan the Navigator: the History Mystery about the Discovery of America (1979)
 Where Do You Think You're Going, Christopher Columbus? (1980)
 Traitor: The Case of Benedict Arnold (1981)
 The Double Life of Pocahontas, illus. Ed Young (Putnam, 1983), winner of the Boston Globe–Horn Book Award, Nonfiction
 Make Way for Sam Houston (1986)
 China's Long March: 6,000 Miles of Danger (1988)
 What's the Big Idea, Ben Franklin? (1988)
 The Great Little Madison (Putnam, 1989), winner of the Boston Globe–Horn Book Award, Nonfiction
 Bully for You, Teddy Roosevelt (1990)
 The Big Book for Peace (Dutton, 1990), illus. Teri Sloat
 Surprising Myself (1992)
 The World in 1492 (1992)
 George Washington's Mother (1992)
 Around the World in a Hundred Years (1993)
 Just a Few Words, Mr. Lincoln (1993)
 Harriet Beecher Stowe and The Beecher Preachers (1994)
 You Want Women to Vote, Lizzie Stanton? (1995)
 Why Not Lafayette? (1999)
 Leonardo's Horse (2001)
 The Lost Colony of Roanoke (2004)

See also

Notes

References

Sources

External links
  at Children's Book Council
 China Homecoming at Google Books — including "About the Author (1985)"
 
 

American women children's writers
American children's writers
American non-fiction children's writers
20th-century American non-fiction writers
20th-century American biographers
21st-century American biographers
American women biographers
Laura Ingalls Wilder Medal winners
National Book Award for Young People's Literature winners
National Humanities Medal recipients
Newbery Honor winners
Wheaton College (Massachusetts) alumni
People from Dobbs Ferry, New York
American centenarians
Women centenarians
1915 births
2017 deaths
Writers from Wuhan
21st-century American women writers
American expatriates in China